Pseudomonas gessardii is a fluorescent, Gram-negative, rod-shaped bacterium isolated from natural mineral waters in France. Based on 16S rRNA analysis, P. gessardii has been placed in the P. fluorescens group.

References

External links
Type strain of Pseudomonas gessardii at BacDive -  the Bacterial Diversity Metadatabase

Pseudomonadales
Bacteria described in 1999